Disco Baby is the second studio album recorded by Van McCoy & the Soul City Symphony, released in 1975 on the Avco label.

History
The album reached No. 12 on the Billboard Top LPs chart and topped the Billboard Soul LPs chart. The album features the single, "The Hustle",  which peaked at No. 1 on the Billboard Hot 100 and Hot Soul Singles charts.

Track listing

Personnel
Van McCoy: Vocals, piano
Eric Gale, Hugh McCracken – guitar
George Degens – rhythm and lead guitar
Gordon Edwards – bass
Richard Tee – piano
Ken Bichel; Synthesizers
Leroy Leon Pendarvis, Jr. – clavinet, piano
 Steve Gadd, Rick Marotta – Drums
Arthur Jenkins, Jr. – percussion
Philip Bodner, Melvyn Davis, Bernie Glow, Marvin Stamm, Wayne Andre, Garnett Brown, Paul Faulise, Urbie Green, Robert Alexander, Seldon Powell, Michael Rod, Romeo Penque, William Slapin, Frank Wess – horns
Gene Orloff, Kermit Moore, George Ricci, Harold Kohon, Joseph Malignaggi, Max Pollikoff, Theodore Israel, Selwart Clarke, Emanuel Green, Emanuel Vardi, Julien Barber, Harry Lookofsky, Matthew Raimondi, Kathryn Kienke – strings
Brenda Hilliard, Albert Bailey – background vocals

Charts

Singles

Certifications

See also
List of number-one R&B albums of 1975 (U.S.)

References

External links
 

1975 albums
Albums produced by Hugo & Luigi
Avco Records albums
Van McCoy albums